This is a list of butterflies on Australian postage stamps. Australia Post has issued several stamp series featuring Australian butterflies: 1981 (10 stamps); 1991 and 1997 (1 stamp only in each series); 1998 (5 stamps); 2003 (2 stamps, plus a moth caterpillar stamp); and 2004 (4 stamps, but 2 species on $2 stamp). The Ulysses Swallowtail, Papilio ulysses, has been featured four times: 1981, 1998, 2003 and 2004. Cethosia cydippe has featured three times: once in 1998, and on two different stamps in 2004. The Clearwing Swallowtail, Cressida cressida, has been featured twice: 1981 and 1997.

 Euschemon rafflesia (1981,4c)
 Troides euphorion (1981, 10c)
 Graphium macleayanus (1981, 20c)
 Papilio ulysses (1981, 27c)
 Pseudalmenus chlorinda (1981, 30c)
 Tirumala hamata (1981, 35c)
 Cressida cressida (1981, 45c)
 Delias aganippe (1981, 60c)
 Ogyris amaryllis (1981, 80c)
 Tisiphone abeona (1981, $1)
 Cizara ardeniae (1991, 43c)
 Cressida cressida (1997, $1)
 Cethosia cydippe (1998, 45c)
 Arhopala centaurus (1998, 45c)
 Junonia villida (1998, 45c)
 Papilio ulysses (1998, 45c)
 Chaetocneme beata (1998, 45c)
 Papilio ulysses (2003, 50c)
 Graphium agamemnon (2003, 50c)
 Cethosia cydippe (2004, 5c)
 Hypolimnas alimena (2004, 10c)
 Vindula arsinoe (2004, 75c)
 Papilio ulysses (2004, $2)
 Cethosia cydippe (2004, $2)

See also
 List of flora on stamps of Australia

Stamps of Australia
Lists of animals of Australia
Postage stamps of Australia
Lists of postage stamps
Australia philately-related lists